May Barani Thaw (born 19 October 1990) is a Burmese  model, actress and beauty pageant titleholder who was crowned Miss Universe Myanmar 2015 and represented Myanmar at the Miss Universe 2015 Pageant.

Education
May Barani Thaw graduated from Dagon University.

Pageantry

Miss Universe Myanmar 2015
Thaw previously competed at the Miss International Myanmar 2014 pageant and placed as the 1st Runner-up. The winner of the contest was replaced by Thaw after the winner withdrew from Miss International 2014 pageant in Tokyo due to personal reasons. In 2015, Thaw was crowned Miss Myanmar 2015 on 3 October 2015 in Gandamar Grand Ballroom, 20 contestants competed for the crown and represented Myanmar at the Miss Universe 2015 pageant.

Miss Universe 2015
On 20 December 2015, she competed in Miss Universe 2015 and was not placed one of the semi-finalists . She was also a roommate of Miss Universe 2015 Pia Wurtzbach while in Las Vegas.

Acting career
May made her acting debut with the military war film Pyidaungsu Thitsar (ပြည်ထောင်စုသစ္စာ), where she played the main role with Wai Lu Kyaw, Kyaw Ye Aung, Nay Dway, Soe Myat Thuzar, May Thet Khine. The film was base on true story of the Battle of Mongkoe, directed by Tin Aung Soe (Pan Myo Taw) which was aired on Myawaddy TV on 27 May 2017 at the 72nd Myanmar Tatmadaw Day. And also screened in Myanmar cinemas on 27 March 2018.

In 2017, she starred the leading role in the television series Two Flower Jousting, alongside Zwe Pyae and Paing Phyo Thu, which was aired on MRTV in March 2018. In 2018, she starred the main role in the television series Beautiful Wives, directed by Aung Aw Ba.

Filmography

Film (Cinema)
Pyidaungsu Thitsar  (2017) 
The Greatest Love (2019)

Television series
Battle of 2 Flowers (2018)
Beautiful Wives Club (2018)
Lu Lu Sein (2020)

References

External links

Living people
Burmese beauty pageant winners
1990 births
People from Yangon
Miss International 2014 delegates
Burmese female models
Miss Universe 2015 contestants
Miss Universe Myanmar winners